Alberta has provincial legislation allowing its municipalities to conduct municipal censuses between April 1 and June 30 inclusive. Municipalities choose to conduct their own censuses for multiple reasons such as to better inform municipal service planning and provision, to capitalize on per capita based grant funding from higher levels of government, or to simply update their populations since the last federal census.

Alberta had 357 municipalities between April 1 and June 30, 2014, down from 358 as at June 30, 2013, which marked the closure of the 2014 legislated municipal census period. At least 39 of these municipalities conducted a municipal census in 2014. Alberta Municipal Affairs recognized those conducted by 37 of these municipalities. By municipal status, it recognized those conducted by 13 of Alberta's 17 cities, 18 of 108 towns, 3 of 93 villages, 1 of 51 summer villages and 2 of 64 municipal districts. In addition to those recognized by Municipal Affairs, censuses were conducted by the Town of Drayton Valley and the Municipal District of Lesser Slave River No. 124.

Some municipalities achieved population milestones as a result of their 2014 censuses. Airdrie and Cochrane grew beyond the 50,000 and 20,000 marks respectively, while both Beaumont and Cold Lake exceeded 15,000. The towns of Morinville, St. Paul and Raymond surpassed 9,000, 6,000 and 4,000 residents respectively, while the Municipal District (MD) of Lesser Slave River No. 124 exceeded 3,000.

Municipal census results 
The following summarizes the results of the numerous municipal censuses conducted in 2014.

Breakdowns

Hamlets 
The following is a list of hamlets that had populations determined by the 2014 municipal census conducted by their administering municipal districts.

Shadow population counts 
Alberta Municipal Affairs defines shadow population as "temporary residents of a municipality who are employed by an industrial or commercial establishment in the municipality for a minimum of 30 days within a municipal census year." The Town of Banff and the MD of Bonnyville No. 87 conducted shadow population counts in 2014. The following presents the results of these counts for comparison with its concurrent municipal census results.

Notes

See also 
2013 Alberta municipal elections
List of communities in Alberta
List of municipalities in Alberta

References

External links 
Alberta Municipal Affairs: Municipal Census & Population Lists
Statistics Canada: Census Profile (2011 Census)

Local government in Alberta
Municipal censuses in Alberta
2014 censuses
2014 in Alberta